The name Hallie has been used for two tropical cyclones in the Atlantic Ocean.
 Tropical Storm Hallie (1966) – made landfall in Mexico as a weakening tropical storm.
 Tropical Storm Hallie (1975) – paralleled near the coast of the southeastern United States before dissipating. 

Atlantic hurricane set index articles